Chidi Nwanu (born 1 January 1967 in Port Harcourt) is a Nigerian former professional footballer who played as a centre-back. He won 20 caps for the Nigeria national team, and was part of the squads for the 1994 FIFA World Cup and the 1988 Summer Olympics.

In 1988, while playing for ACB Lagos, Nwanu was declared unwanted by coach Patrick Ekeji. Nwanu went on to play in lower divisions in Belgium before he was picked up by Jupiler League side K.S.K. Beveren. After three seasons he was bought by R.S.C. Anderlecht, who won the league twice during his stay. Nwanu played very few matches; he retired after an unsuccessful spell in RKC Waalwijk.

References

External links
Nigerian Players

1967 births
Living people
Sportspeople from Port Harcourt
Nigerian footballers
Association football defenders
Nigeria international footballers
Olympic footballers of Nigeria
Footballers at the 1988 Summer Olympics
1994 FIFA World Cup players
Belgian Pro League players
Challenger Pro League players
Eredivisie players
Enyimba F.C. players
Heartland F.C. players
ACB Lagos F.C. players
K.V.C. Westerlo players
K.S.K. Beveren players
R.S.C. Anderlecht players
Sint-Truidense V.V. players
RKC Waalwijk players
Nigerian expatriate footballers
Nigerian expatriate sportspeople in Belgium
Expatriate footballers in Belgium
Nigerian expatriate sportspeople in the Netherlands
Expatriate footballers in the Netherlands